Nanometa purpurapunctata is a species of spider in the family Tetragnathidae. It is found in New Zealand.

References

Tetragnathidae
Spiders of New Zealand